Dawn is a mostly feminine given name, although it can be used as a masculine given name as well. It is of Old English origin, and its meaning is the first appearance of light, daybreak.

It is sometimes used as a name for Eos (Greek: Ἠώς), the Greek goddess of the dawn.

People
 Dawn Best (born 1981), American comic book artist
 Dawn Birley (born 1977), Canadian taekwondo practitioner and actress 
 Dawn Black (born 1943), politician in British Columbia, Canada
 Dawn Brancheau (1969-2010), SeaWorld trainer killed by Tilikum, the orca in 2010.
 Dawn Butler (born 1969), British Labour Member of Parliament for Brent Central
 Dawn Burrell (born 1973), American long jumper
 Dawn Cavanagh, South African women's rights activist
 Dawn Crosby (1963-1996) American Singer, was the former lead singer of the underground act Detente.
Dawn Dawson, American jetski racer and commentator
Dawn Dumont, Canadian writer
 Dawn Ellerbe (born 1974), American hammer thrower
 Dawn Evelyn Paris (1918–1993), Oscar-nominated American actress
 Dawn Fitzpatrick, American investment and financial officer
 Dawn Frank, American biologist and academic administrator 
 Dawn Fraser (born 1937), Australian champion swimmer
 Dawn French (born 1957), British comedian
 Dawn Hudson (born c. 1957), CEO of the Academy of Motion Picture Arts and Sciences.
 Dawn Langstroth (born 1979), Canadian singer/songwriter and painter
 Dawn Lake (1927-2006), Australian entertainer
 Dawnn Lewis (born 1961), American actress
 Dawn Lott, African-American mathematician
 Dawn Marie (born 1970), American former professional wrestler and former WWE Diva
 Dawn Mello (1931–2020), American fashion retail executive
 Dawn Moncrieffe (born 1968), Canadian athlete
 Dawn Penn (born 1952), Jamaican singer
 Dawn Porter (born 1979), British television presenter
 Dawn Powell (1896–1965), American writer of satirical novels
 Dawn Primarolo (born 1954), British Member of Parliament for Bristol South
 Dawn Rasmussen, retired athlete and sports administrator from Samoa
 Dawn Angelique Richard (born 1983), member of the musical girl group Danity Kane
 Dawn Robinson (born 1968), former lead singer of supergroup En Vogue and Lucy Pearl
 Dawn Rossi (born 1971), radio personality heard on The Rob, Arnie, and Dawn Show
 Dawn Silva (born 1954), American funk vocalist
 Dawn Staley (born 1970), US-American basketball player and coach
 Dawn Steel (1946–1997), first woman to run a major Hollywood film studio
 Dawn Wells (1938–2020), American actress
 Dawn Walker, Australian politician

Fictional characters
 Dawn Harper, female protagonist of the series Nicky, Ricky, Dicky & Dawn 
 Dawn (Pokémon), female protagonist of Pokémon Diamond, Pearl and Platinum
Dawn Bellwether, assistant mayor and main antagonist of Zootopia
Dawn Green, the second victim of the serial killer on True Blood
 Dawn Schafer, a character in The Baby-sitters Club and California Diaries
 Dawn Summers, a character in the popular television and comic book series Buffy the Vampire Slayer
 Dawn Swann, a character in the popular BBC soap opera EastEnders
 Dawn Tinsley, the receptionist in the British situation comedy The Office
 Dawn Wiener, the main character in the film Welcome to the Dollhouse
 Dawn Woods, a character in the popular ITV soap opera Emmerdale
 Prairie Dawn, a muppet character in Sesame Street
 Dawn Swatworthy, villainess in The Buzz on Maggie
 Dawn, a character from Total Drama: Revenge of the Island
 Dawn Star, a character from the action role-playing video game Jade Empire

Surname

Adria Dawn, American actress, filmmaker and educator
 Dolly Dawn (born Theresa Stabile, 1916–2002), American singer
 Elizabeth Dawn (born Sylvia Butterfield, 1939–2017), British actress
 Jeff Dawn, American makeup artist 
 Julie Dawn (born Juliana Mostosi, 1920–2000), English singer
 Marva Dawn (1948–2021), Christian theologian, author, musician and educator
 Pieretta Dawn (born 1994), English-writing Thai author

Spacecraft
Dawn (spacecraft), which is exploring 4 Vesta and later Ceres in the Asteroid belt.  
Dawn

External links
 Genealogy of the Surname Dawn.
 Genealogy sources for the Surname Dawn.

English feminine given names
English-language feminine given names